Pobeda Solar Park is a 50.6 MW photovoltaic (PV) plant in Pobeda, in the Pleven Province of Northern Bulgaria.

The power plant is monitored from a control center in Sofia, along with three other photovoltaic power plants totaling 85 MW, expected to produce a combined total of 95 GWh/year.

This projects was funded through the E.U and is one more step that Bulgaria is making to modernize and join their fellow E.U. countries with efforts to expand clean energy.

On July 2, 2012 the control module and transformer were damaged by a rocket-propelled grenade, shortly before the power plant was connected to the grid.

See also 

 List of photovoltaic power stations
 Solar power in Bulgaria

References 

Photovoltaic power stations in Bulgaria
Buildings and structures in Pleven Province